Alia Muhammad Baker (also spelled "Baqer" or "Baqir"; 1952 – 13 August 2021) was an Iraqi librarian who was the chief librarian of the Al Basrah Central Library in Basra. Baker saved an estimated 30,000 books from destruction during the Iraq War, including a biography of Muhammad from around 1300.

Biography
Baker had worked at the library for 14 years. As a child she was told the story of the burning of Baghdad's Nizamiyya library and was horrified.

As war with the US and UK loomed, government officials denied her requests that the books be moved to safety. When government offices moved into the library and an anti-aircraft gun was placed on the roof, she started to smuggle books out of the library.

With a Shi'ite population relatively unsupportive of the Hussein regime, Basra was one of the first targets in the 2003 invasion of Iraq beginning in November. Coalition forces met with more resistance than expected. Most of the invading American troops moved northwards, leaving Basra under a multi-week siege led by the British. The city was soon suffering from a "humanitarian crisis" in which residents lacked both water and electricity.

The invading forces (including the Royal Australian Air Force) used bombing and psychological warfare during the siege.  Eventually, a large column of Iraqi tanks was destroyed by RAF bombs and 300 prisoners were taken in a battle outside the city. British troops occupied the city on 6 April.

After the government employees vacated the building and the library furnishings were looted, Baker convinced Anis Muhammad, the owner of the restaurant Hamdan, to help. Baker enlisted the help of locals to smuggle the remaining books over the library's seven foot wall and into the dining room of the restaurant next door. Before the library was destroyed, Baker had rescued 70% of the library's collection: 30,000 books, including English and Arabic books and a Spanish language Koran.

Baker and her husband rented a truck and distributed the books among library employees, friends, and their own home after things settled down in Basra. The library was rebuilt in 2004 and Baker was reinstated as chief librarian.

The story of how Baker rescued the library books has inspired two children's books: Alia's Mission and Jeanette Winter's The Librarian of Basra (Harcourt 2005). Some of the money raised from sales has been donated to the library. Prof. S. Sivadas has published a book in Malayalam entitled Pusthaka maalaakhayute katha about her.

Baker died from COVID-19 in Basra on 13 August 2021, during the COVID-19 pandemic in Iraq.

References

Sources

External links
 "Iraqi Librarian Becomes Cultural Hero in 2 Children's Books", The New York Times, 17 March 2005
 Photograph of the reconstructed library
 Video taken from invading tank

1952 births
2021 deaths
Deaths from the COVID-19 pandemic in Iraq
Iraqi librarians
Iraqi women
People from Basra Province